The Société Parisienne d'Édition (S.P.É. or SPÉ), originally known as Offenstadt Frères then Publications Offenstadt, was a French publishing house founded by the Offenstadt brothers towards the end of the 19th century. They adopted the name "Société parisienne d'édition" just after the end of the First World War. The five Offenstadt brothers – Charles, Georges, Maurice, Nathan and Villefranche – had a wide range of publications within their portfolio, exploiting technical advances in low-cost colour lithography. They are best known for publishing popular periodicals aimed at the youth market, such as L'Épatant, L'Intrépide and L'Illustré; and comics, often featuring larger than life characters like Les Pieds nickelés, L'Espiègle Lili and Bibi Fricotin. They also published magazines aimed at adult audiences, providing a platform for emerging and sometimes controversial writers and artists – such as Maurice de Vlaminck and André Derain. They were among the first to publish (in Sciences et Voyages) Jean Vieuchange's bestselling account of the epic journey to Smara, made by Jean's brother, Michel Vieuchange in 1931.

The Offenstadt brothers were often the target of the moral censure of the period, particularly from French senator, René Bérenger, popularly known as père pudeur ("papa prudity"). Because of the brothers' Jewish origins, they were stripped of ownership of their publishing house in 1940 under the Aryanisation laws during the Occupation.  They regained control in 1946 but by then competitors had moved into their niche and they were unable to repeat their pre-war successes. In the 1960s, SPE was taken over by Publications Georges Ventillard, which in turn disappeared in 1990.

Notable publications

Notes and sources

Notes

Sources

 
 
 
 

Publishing companies of France
Comic book publishing companies of France
Magazine publishing companies of France